Lakhnadon is a town and a nagar panchayat in Seoni district in the Indian state of Madhya Pradesh, and the headquarters of Lakhnadon janpad and tehsil. NH44 & NH34 crosses each other at Lakhnadon. 

It is best known for its sagon wood, Tendu leaves, and its pure Khoya. 

It is one of the oldest tehsils of Madhya Pradesh and is the second biggest town in Seoni district.

Etymology
According to local belief, the city derives its name "Lakhnadon" from a mythical ruler Raja Lakhan Kunwar. However, apart from a small shrine dedicated to him along Rani Tal, which literally translates to "queen's pond," there is no evidence to support his existence in public record.

History 

The town is said to be named after a former ruler, Raja Lakhan Kunwar. There is a belief among the locals that there is a palace of Kunwar inside Ranital lake, and its peak can be seen during the summer season, when the water level declines.

Geography

It has an average elevation of 607 metres (1991 feet).
It is just a little far from the geographical centre of the Indian sub-continent. It lies in the southwest of Jabalpur and north of Seoni and also neighbours Narsinghpur by its west.[4]
It is surrounded by sagon and tendu trees that cover the town from all sides.
[5]

Demographics
As per 2011 India census, the total population of Lakhnadon (urban area) is 17,302, of which 8,930 are males and 8,372 are females. Thus, the average sex ratio of Lakhnadon is 938, lower than the national average of 943. Furthermore, the literacy rate in Lakhnadon is 86.2%, which is higher than those of Seoni (72.1%) and India (74.04%). Specifically, in Lakhnadon, the male literacy rate is 90.4%, and the female literacy rate is 81.82%.

Tourism 

The tourist attractions in and around Lakhnadon include the Gaytri Shaktipeeth, Nehru park, Siddhbaba Ranital, Chilachond dam, and Banjari temple.
Ram Mandir and Hanuman Mandir are two of the oldest temples of Lakhnadon which were renovated by Pt Ram Shanker Shukla. Meditation stones are kept in both the temples in memory of Pt Ram Shanker Shukla. Pt Ram Shanker Shukla laid the foundation of Radha Krishna temple, but died on 22 November 2002, before it was completed.
Mathghogra, is also an important place of interest for forest tourism  approx.5 km from lakhnadon toward tola village. Math Ghogra is a popular for shiva temple located inside a dark cave surrounded by a small waterfall and holy pond. People believes that taking holy dip in Math ghogra's pond has spiritual significance.
There is Van vidhyalaya & Jain Mandir for visit 
Now there is a Mid way treat Restaurant you can go for lunch

References

Cities and towns in Seoni district
Seoni, Madhya Pradesh